Stadionul Mircea Stan is a multi-purpose stadium in Colonești, Romania, that is currently used mostly for football matches. The home ground of the Romanian soccer club Vedița Colonești, it has a capacity of 500 people (200 seated).

The stadium is named after Mircea Stan, a former footballer in the Romanian Liga I and the son of the Nicolae Stan, the current mayor of Colonești.

References

External links
Stadionul Mircea Stan at soccerway.com

Football venues in Romania
Sport in Olt County
Buildings and structures in Olt County